Warrior is the fifth studio album by the Swedish death metal band, Unleashed. It was released in 1997 on Century Media Records.

Track listing
All songs written by Unleashed, unless stated otherwise

Personnel
 Johnny Hedlund – vocals, bass
 Fredrik Folkare – guitar
 Tomas Olsson – guitar
 Anders Schultz – drums

References

External links
 
 Unleashed band website

1997 albums
Unleashed (band) albums
Century Media Records albums